The 12054 / 12053 Amritsar–Haridwar Jan Shatabdi Express is a Superfast Express train belonging to Indian Railways – Northern Railway zone that runs between  and  in India, serving the states of Punjab, Haryana, Uttar Pradesh & Uttarakhand.

It operates as train number 12054 from Amritsar Junction to Haridwar Junction and as train number 12053 in the reverse direction.

Coaches

The 12054 / 53 Amritsar–Haridwar Jan Shatabdi Express presently has 1 AC Chair Car & 7 Second Class Jan Shatabdi seating coaches.

As is customary with most train services in India, coach composition may be amended at the discretion of Indian Railways depending on demand.

Service

The 12054 / 53 Amritsar–Haridwar Jan Shatabdi Express covers the distance of 407 kilometres in 7 hours 00 mins (58.14 km/hr) & in 7 hours 35 mins (53.67 km/hr) as 12053 Haridwar–Amritsar Jan Shatabdi Express.

As the average speed of the train is above 55 km/hr, as per Indian Railways rules, its fare includes a Superfast Express surcharge.

Routeing

,  to Haridwar Junction.

Traction

Despite electrification of the 250 km stretch between Amritsar Junction & , a Ghaziabad-based WAP-7 or WAP-5 locomotive powers the train for its entire run.

Timings

12054 Amritsar–Haridwar Jan Shatabdi Express leaves Amritsar Junction every day except Thursday at 06:55 hrs IST and reaches Haridwar Junction at 13:55 hrs IST on the same day.
12053 Haridwar–Amritsar Jan Shatabdi Express leaves Haridwar Junction every day except Thursday at 14:30 hrs IST and reaches Amritsar Junction at 22:05 hrs IST on the same day.

References

External links

Jan Shatabdi Express trains
Rail transport in Haryana
Transport in Amritsar
Trains from Haridwar